Divya Bharti (25 February 1974 – 5 April 1993) was an Indian actress who worked predominantly in Hindi and Telugu films. Known for her acting versatility and beauty, she was considered one of the most popular and highest paid Indian actresses of her time. She is regarded as one of the best actresses of Indian Cinema.

Bharti started her film career as a teenager, while she was doing pin-up modeling assignments. She made her debut with a lead role opposite Venkatesh in the Telugu-language romantic action Bobbili Raja (1990), and subsequently appeared in a financially unsuccessful Tamil-language film Nila Pennae (1990) In films like Naa Ille Naa Swargam (1991) and Assembly Rowdy (1991) she had minor roles. Bharti had her first commercial success with the romantic comedy Rowdy Alludu (1991).

After featuring in Telugu films, she progressed to Hindi cinema in 1992 and made her acting debut with the Hindi action thriller Vishwatma (1992). The 1992 action-comedy Shola Aur Shabnam, a box office hit, marked a turning point in her career. She achieved further success with starring roles such as in the romance film Deewana (1992), which won her the Filmfare Award for Best Female Debut.

Bharti died on 5 April 1993 (aged 19), after falling from the balcony of the fifth floor of her apartment in Mumbai. The mysterious circumstances of her death have spawned a number of conspiracy theories.

Early life
Bharti was born in Bombay on 25 February 1974 to Om Prakash Bharti and Meeta Bharti. She had a younger brother named Kunal and a half-sister Poonam, who was the child of Om Prakash Bharti's first marriage. Actress Kainaat Arora is her cousin. She spoke Hindi, English and Marathi fluently. In her early years, she was known for her bubbly personality and doll-like looks. She studied at Maneckji Cooper High School in Juhu, Mumbai. Bharti was a restless student at school and completed the 9th standard before pursuing an acting career.

Acting career

Early roles and Telugu films
In 1988, Bharti, then a ninth-grader, was signed by filmmaker Nandu Tolani for one of his films. She was originally scheduled to make her screen debut in Gunahon Ka Devta in 1988, but her role was cancelled and she was replaced by Sangeeta Bijlani. Kirti Kumar (Govinda's brother) noticed Bharti at a video library, and was eager to sign her for his project Radha Ka Sangam opposite Govinda. Kumar met with director Dilip Shankar and managed to release Bharti from her contract. After taking dancing and acting lessons for months to prepare for her role, Bharti was dropped and replaced by Juhi Chawla. It was speculated that Kumar's possessiveness over Bharti and her childish nature were the cause of her replacement.
Bharti's career was stalled until D. Ramanaidu, a Telugu film producer, offered her a leading role in the film Bobbili Raja opposite his son Daggubati Venkatesh. She began shooting in Andhra Pradesh for her screen debut. The film was released in the summer of 1990 and became a hit. Bobbili Raja remains one of the most popular and iconic Telugu movies. Later in the year, Bharti acted in a Tamil film, Nila Pennae, opposite Anand. The film was critically and financially unsuccessful.

In box office ratings, Bharti ranked next to Vijayashanti who has been widely called  The Lady Superstar and Lady Amitabh of South Indian cinema. In 1991, Bharti had back-to-back hits with action comedy film Rowdy Alludu and drama Assembly Rowdy opposite actors Chiranjeevi and Mohan Babu, respectively. Later that year, Bharti began filming A. Kodandarami Reddy's action romance Dharma Kshetram under Sri Rajeev Productions. Bharti got to work with Telugu film actor Nandamuri Balakrishna.

Transition to Hindi films and stardom 
While Bharti celebrated her success in Andhra Pradesh, Bollywood's top directors were eager to sign her for films. Bharti's first Hindi film was Rajiv Rai's 1992 film Vishwatma. In an interview to Filmfare, she said that she liked her role as Kusum, Sunny Deol's love interest, in the film, describing it as a "very good role". The film was an average box office performer but gained Bharti wider recognition from the public as well as film critics. Bharti was most notable for the song used in the film Saat Samundar. A week later, Bharti's next film, Lawrence D'Souza's romantic drama Dil Ka Kya Kasoor, in which she starred alongside Prithvi, was released. The film was not a box office success but was recognized for its music.

In March 1992, David Dhawan's romantic action drama Shola Aur Shabnam was released. It was popular with critics and was a box office hit in India, marking Bharti's first major hit in Hindi films. She achieved further success in Raj Kanwar's Filmfare Award-winning love story Deewana, which starred veteran actor Rishi Kapoor and newcomer Shahrukh Khan. It was one of the biggest hits of 1992. Her performance in Deewana was highly appreciated. Critics reported that Bharti belonged to a new breed of Hindi film actors who broke away from character stereotypes. Bharti won the Filmfare Award for Lux New Face of the Year. By July 1992, Bharti's work in Deewana was said to have earned her more recognition.

She had several Hindi releases that year—the action drama Jaan Se Pyaara, which featured Bharti alongside Govinda once again, romantic drama Geet opposite Avinash Wadhawan, action Dushman Zamana alongside Armaan Kohli, and action drama Balwaan, which marked the debut of Suniel Shetty. The latter achieved moderate success. In October, she appeared in Hema Malini's romantic drama Dil Aashna Hai, which did not do as well at the box office. She portrayed a bar dancer who sets out to find her birth mother. The role earned her critical appreciation. Bharti decided to act in one Telugu movie per year to not disappoint her Telugu audience. Chittemma Mogudu was released in early 1993, again starring the popular couple of Bharti and Mohan Babu. In the last film to be released during her lifetime, the ensemble film Kshatriya, she co-starred alongside Sunny Deol, Sanjay Dutt and Raveena Tandon. It was released on 26 March 1993.

Bharti was replaced in films she had not completed, including Mohra (played by Raveena Tandon), Kartavya (played by Juhi Chawla), Vijaypath (played by Tabu), Dilwale (played by Raveena Tandon), and Andolan (played by Mamta Kulkarni). She was more than halfway through the filming of Laadla at the time of her death and the movie was reshot with Sridevi portraying the role.

Shortly before her death, she had completed filming for Rang and Shatranj; these were released posthumously on 7 July 1993 and 17 December 1993 respectively and achieved moderate success. Although she had completed filming her scenes for both films, a dubbing artist was used as she never got the chance to dub for the films. Her incomplete Telugu film Tholi Muddhu was partly completed by actress Rambha, who slightly resembled Bharti and hence was used as her body double to complete her remaining scenes; the film was released in October 1993.

Personal life 
Bharti met director-producer Sajid Nadiadwala through actor Govinda while working on the set of Shola Aur Shabnam, and they married on 10 May 1992 at a private ceremony in the presence of her hairdresser and friend Sandhya, Sandhya's husband, and a qazi at Nadiadwala's Tulsi Buildings residence in Bombay. It has been reported she converted to Islam. The marriage was kept secret so as to not affect her prosperous film career.

Death 
In the late evening hours of 5 April 1993, Bharti fell from the balcony window of her fifth-floor apartment in Tulsi Buildings, Versova, Andheri West in Bombay. When her guests Neeta Lulla, Neeta's husband Shyam Lulla, Bharti's maid Amrita Kumari, and neighbours realised what had happened, she was rushed in an ambulance to the emergency department at Cooper Hospital, where she died. She was 19 years old. Though shrouded in mystery, the official cause of her death was declared to be severe head injuries and internal bleeding. She was cremated on 7 April 1993 at the Vile Parle crematorium in Bombay.

Reactions and legacy 
Bharti acted in 21 films during her short career, and was one of the highest-paid Indian actresses at the time of her death.
Her offscreen persona and unique acting ability has been highly appreciated and reminisced by many of her co-stars and critics. Shah Rukh Khan, who shared screen space with her in Deewana and Dil Aashna Hai, once said, "...one of the finest actresses I have ever worked with is Divya Bharti." Suniel Shetty has remarked, "I have not yet seen any other actress who is as talented as Divya Bharti. I don't think anyone had as much talent as she possessed. Her talent was unbelievable, she'd do masti and bachpana (fun and childish behavior) before the shoot commenced and when asked for, she'd give such a perfect shot that I used to forget my own dialogues!". Actress Karishma Kapoor has paid her tribute by saying, "She was so wonderful in Deewana.. couldn't take my eyes off! We really miss her a lot." Moreover, Chunky Panday has pronounced her to be  "chulbuli" (bubbly) and that "she was full of life, energy and loved to work with her in Vishwatma."

According to actor Govinda, "Juhi, Kajol and Karisma are in different spot, Divya had a totally different kind of appeal from those three. What she had was natural and god given, it cannot be created by anyone, however much they may try. She had a raw, tamed, wild look about her which magnetised the audience." Producer Guddu Dhanoa, upon working with her in Deewana, has stated that, "Bollywood misses her a lot and the void which was created owing to her death could not be filled by anyone else." Archana Puran Singh in the caption of one her social media posts has written, "Divya was a sweet soul, still remember sobbing the day she passed away."

New generation artists like Varun Dhawan and Anushka Sharma have also remembered Divya Bharti in some of their interviews. Varun has revealed Bharti to be "one of the actresses from 90s he would have loved to work with." Anushka Sharma has been quoted saying "I became a huge fan of Divya Bharti after watching her songs. I would dance to almost all her songs, especially 'Saat Samundar'. When she passed away, my mother didn't tell me for about a week because she knew I would break down."

In 2011 Dev Anand made the movie Chargesheet, which was loosely based on her death and the mystery surrounding it.

Filmography

Television

Unfinished films

Accolades

Footnotes

References

External links
 
 Official website 

1974 births
1993 deaths
Actresses from Mumbai
Accidental deaths from falls
Accidental deaths in India
Indian film actresses
20th-century Indian actresses
Filmfare Awards winners
Actresses in Telugu cinema
Actresses in Hindi cinema
Actresses in Tamil cinema